Gypsy Blood is a 1934 German comedy film directed by  and starring Adele Sandrock, Georg Alexander, and Erik Ode. It was released by the German subsidiary of Universal Pictures. In Austria it was known by the title Das Ungarmädel.

The film's sets were designed by the art director Hermann Warm.

Cast

References

Bibliography

External links 
 

1934 films
1934 comedy films
German comedy films
Films of Nazi Germany
1930s German-language films
Films directed by Charles Klein
Universal Pictures films
German black-and-white films
1930s German films